Khirbat Al-Manara was a Palestinian Arab village in the Haifa Subdistrict. It was depopulated during the 1948 Arab-Israeli War on May 21, 1948. It was located 19 km south of Haifa.

History
In the 1931 census Khirbat Al-Manara was counted together with  Ijzim, Al-Mazar and Qumbaza. The total population  was  2160, 88 Christians, 2082  Muslims, in a total of 442 houses.

References

Bibliography

External links
Welcome To al-Manara
Khirbat al-Manara, Zochrot
Survey of Western Palestine, Map 8: IAA,  Wikimedia Commons

Arab villages depopulated during the 1948 Arab–Israeli War
District of Haifa